Wei or WEI may refer to:

States
 Wey (state) (衛, 1040–209 BC), Wei in pinyin, but spelled Wey to distinguish from the bigger Wei of the Warring States
 Wei (state) (魏, 403–225 BC), one of the seven major states of the Warring States period
 Cao Wei (曹魏, 220–265), ruled North China during the Three Kingdoms Period
 Ran Wei (冉魏, 350–352), short-lived Sixteen Kingdoms period state
 Northern Wei (北魏, 386–535), ruled North China during the Southern and Northern Dynasties, later split into:
Western Wei (西魏, 535–557)
Eastern Wei (東魏, 534–550)
 Wei (Dingling) (魏, 388–392), state of Dingling/Gaoche ethnicity in China

Places
Wei River, a main tributary of the Yellow River
Wei County, Handan (魏县), Hebei, China
Wei County, Xingtai (威县), Hebei, China

People

 Wei (given name), different variations of Chinese given names
 Wei (surname), various Chinese surnames (魏, 衛, 尉, 蔿, 韋)
 Wei Wei (disambiguation)

Other uses
Wei (rank), a  company-grade officer in Chinese armed forces.
Wei (value token), a subunit of the Ether value token on the Ethereum blockchain
Wei, a star otherwise known as Epsilon Scorpii
Wei Empire, a fictional state and planetary romance of Yulia Latynina, consisting of 5 novels and 2 short stories
Wau Ecology Institute
Windows Experience Index (WEI) score, a measure of the user-perceived performance of a computer running Microsoft Windows
WEI, IATA airport code for Weipa Airport, Weipa, Queensland, Australia
WEi, a South Korean boy group

See also 
 Way (disambiguation)
 Wee (disambiguation)
 Wey (disambiguation)
 Whey (disambiguation)